Helen Hays is an American ornithologist and conservationist. Hays has lived on Great Gull Island for six months of each year since 1969 in her capacity as chair of the Great Gull Island committee at the American Museum of Natural History. As of 2014, this work saw the island's tern population increase tenfold compared to the level of 1969.

Early life
Helen Hays grew up in Johnstown, New York. She attended Wellesley College, graduating with a bachelor's degree in biology in 1953. She next conducted graduate work in Manitoba at Cornell University’s Delta Waterfowl field station, but both Cornell and Wellesley refused to credit her with a master's degree for her work, studying ruddy duck breeding biology; Wellesley said her study was "not relevant". Nevertheless, her research into ruddy ducks was eventually published in the leading peer-reviewed ornithological journal in North America, The Auk, as well as the Handbook of North American Birds.

Career
Without an advanced degree, Hays began her career in 1956 in low-level positions cataloguing specimens and performing secretarial work. In 1969 Hays made her first trip to Great Gull Island, which the American Museum of Natural History had recently purchased. At that time hunting had greatly reduced the numbers of breeding pairs of common terns and roseate terns in North America. In 1969 Hays began spending six months of the year on the island working to restore the local population.  Hays lives in Manhattan in the other portion of the year. During her stays on the island, she lives in former barracks and is assisted by other volunteer conservationists in her work. The researchers weigh the terns and help to monitor hatchlings and improve nesting conditions for them. As of 2014, over 26,000 terns have nested on the island, more than 10 times the number when Hays started her work.

Awards
Hays has received the Conservation Service Award from the United States Department of the Interior, the Lifetime Achievement Award from the New York chapter of the National Audubon Society, and an Alumnae Achievement Award from Wellesley. In 2015, she was awarded an honorary doctorate of science from the University of Connecticut.

References

American ornithologists
Women ornithologists
1932 births
Living people
People from Johnstown, New York
People associated with the American Museum of Natural History
Wellesley College alumni
Scientists from New York (state)